Chromolucuma is a genus of plants in the family Sapotaceae described in 1925.

The genus is native to Central and South America.

Species
 Chromolucuma apiculata Alves-Araújo & M.Alves - Bahia
 Chromolucuma baehniana Monach - Venezuela (Amazonas), Guyana
 Chromolucuma congestifolia (Pilz) Alves-Araújo & M.Alves - Panama, Costa Rica
 Chromolucuma rubriflora Ducke - Colombia (Antioquia), S Venezuela (Amazonas), Brazil (Amazonas, Roraima, Pará)

References

Sapotaceae genera
Chrysophylloideae
Taxa named by Adolpho Ducke